Cape Town fire may refer to:

 Table Mountain fire (2000)
 Table Mountain fire (2006)
 Table Mountain fire (2009)
 2015 Western Cape fire season
 2021 Table Mountain fire